Ishkhan was a feudal title in medieval Armenia, literally meaning prince. The word originates from Iranian *xšāna- (cf. Sogdian axšāwan, "king"). The title ishkhan was used both in parallel and in substitute of other Armenian feudal titles, such as nakharar, paron, douks, ter, or melik.

Ishkhan is also an Armenian first name.

References

Sources
 
 

Medieval Armenia
Armenian noble titles
Armenian given names